Kopciowice  is a village in the administrative district of Gmina Chełm Śląski, within Bieruń-Lędziny County, Silesian Voivodeship, in southern Poland.

References

Kopciowice